Phaeosphaeria microscopica is a fungal plant pathogen that infects wheat.

References

Fungal plant pathogens and diseases
Wheat diseases
Phaeosphaeriaceae
Fungi described in 1872
Taxa named by Petter Adolf Karsten